Sophie Choudry (born 8 February 1982) is a British singer and actress based in India. She has been active primarily in Hindi-language films and is also a former MTV India VJ and occasional model, and television presenter.

Early life
Sophie Choudry was born and brought up in Manchester. Her father was a major fan of Sophia Loren and hence her birthname is "Sophia", however she now goes by the name "Sophie". She has an elder brother.

Choudry studied at London School of Economics, graduating in European politics and French and is also a gold medalist from the London Academy of Music and Dramatic Art. Furthermore, she studied for nearly two years at the "Sciences Po" in Paris, France. BollySpice reports, that while still studying, Choudry became a VJ for Zee UK.

She took a few classes in Indian classical dance as Bharatnatyam, which she learnt in London for four years as well as Western dances like salsa. She is also well trained in Western classical music, which she learnt for three years in the UK from Helena Shenel, as well as in Indian classical music, which she learnt from Pandit Ashkaran Sharma.

Career
She began her career on Zee Tv UK in the late 1990s presenting Zee Top 10, a chart show also based in the UK/ Europe which became the number 1 show on the channel for several years before she launched her own career in Music.

Music
Choudry began her singing career. When she was 12 years old, her talent was discovered by noted music director Biddu, who launched her musical career. She, at first, lent her voice as a backup singer to playback singers like Shweta Shetty and Alisha Chinai.

In 2000, Choudry started her career as a pop singer with her all-female band "Sansara" with a song which Choudry herself wrote ("Yeh Dil Sun Raha Hai"). After their second hit “Habibi” the band separated and Choudry started her solo singing career, donning the videos "Habibi" and "Le Le Mera Dil" in 2002. Her latest single 'Aaj Naiyo Sauna'

Choudry then moved to Mumbai in 2003, becoming a VJ for MTV India and hosting the popular show MTV Loveline, which eventually gained her popularity. 
Less than one year on, Sophie returned with her newest offering, “Baby Love”. According to Choudry, she listened to over 400 songs to come up with her perfect 12. Songs on this album include "Ek Pardesi Mera Dil Le Gaya", "Jadugar Saiyaan", "Zuby Zuby", "Dil Ke Armaan", "Ghar Aaya Mera Pardesi", and "Bachke Rehna Re Baba".

In December 2009, Choudry launched her album Sound of Sophie, which had no remixes, but only original numbers. The launch of this album marked her association with the Indian fashion brand MADAME, who hired her as their first brand ambassador. She worked with well-known music composers such as Rishi Rich, Bappi Lahiri, Biddu and Gaurav Das Gupta in the album. Choudry has also participated in Jhalak Dikhhla Jaa, Season 7.

Movies

After the huge success of her babylove album, Sophie was launched by David Dhawan and Vadhu Bhagnani in “shaadi no1” costarring Sanjay dutt, Fardeen Khan and Zayed khan. Her next release was the new age “Pyar ke side effects” with Mallika Sherawat and rahul Bose which went on to become a runaway hit! Her role as “baby girl volume 3 “ was loved by all. She soon signed speed with Vikram Bhatt, alibaug with Sanjay Gupta and daddy cool with Inder kumar. But it was her song “aala re aala” in shootout at Wadala with John Abraham that went on to become a big hit. Followed by her special role in once upon a time in mumbai doobara with Akshay kumar. She was last seen on the big screen with mahesh babu in Sukumar’s “1 nenokkadine.”

Other ventures

In December 2017 she launched a wellness company called Lifetox with her partners. They developed  a fitness ayurvedic tea called Fittox and more products including Lifetox vitamins since then.

Filmography

 All films are in Hindi unless otherwise noted.

TV appearances
2014 Jhalak Dikhhla Jaa 7 as contestant - Eliminated 12 week - 31 August 2014
2014 Bigg Boss 8 as guest

Discography 
 "Yeh Dil Sun Raha Hai" (2000) as part of Sansara
 "Habibi" (2000)
 "Le Le Mera Dil" (2002)
 "Sophie & Dr. Love" (2003)
 "Baby Love - Sophie" (2004)
 "Aap Jaisa Koi" in Sweet Honey Mix (2004)
 "Sound of Sophie" (2009)
 "Hungama Ho Gaya" (2012) digital single
 "Hungama Ho Gaya" (2013) compilation album
 "Do You Know Baby" (2015)
 "Aaj Naiyo Sauna" (2019) with Manj Musik

Awards
 2001: UK Asian Pop Award for Best Female Newcomer
 2004: Lycra MTV Style Award for Most Stylish Female in Music
 2005: Bollywood Music Award for Best Female Pop Artist

References

External links

 
 

Living people
1980 births
Actresses from Manchester
Actresses in Hindi cinema
Actresses in Tamil cinema
Actresses in Telugu cinema
Actresses in Hindi television
Alumni of the London Academy of Music and Dramatic Art
Alumni of the London School of Economics
Bollywood playback singers
British actresses of Indian descent
British expatriate actresses in India
British VJs (media personalities)
English expatriates in India
English film actresses
English people of Indian descent
English pop singers
English television actresses
European actresses in India
Expatriate musicians in India
Sciences Po alumni
Singers from Manchester
21st-century English actresses
21st-century English singers
21st-century English women singers